Tzarfat is a Biblical placename that may refer to Sarepta in Lebanon. In  later times, it came to be identified with France. It is still the name of France in Modern Hebrew, and is analogous to Sefarad, and Ashkenaz.

The epithet "Tzarfati" was frequently applied in rabbinical literature to Jews of French birth or descent.

See also
Sarfati

References

Hebrew Bible places